Four Square Jane is a 1929 thriller novel by the British writer Edgar Wallace.

Plot Overview

The novel is a collection of tales published in 1919 and 1920.

 "The Theft of the Lewinstein Jewels" published in The Weekly News, December 13, 1919
 "Jane in Custody" published in The Weekly News, December 20, 1919
 "The Stolen Romney" published in The Weekly News, December 27, 1919
 "The Murder in James Street" published in The Weekly News, January 10, 1920
 "Robbing the Royal Mail" published in The Weekly News, January 17, 1920
 "The Actress's Emerald Necklace" published in The Weekly News, January 24, 1920
 "The Secret of a Box of Cigars" published in The Weekly News, January 31, 1920
 "The End" published in The Weekly News, February 7, 1920

Adaptation
In 1961 it was turned into the film The Fourth Square, directed by Allan Davis as part of a long-running series of Wallace films made at Merton Park Studios.

References

Bibliography
 Goble, Alan. The Complete Index to Literary Sources in Film. Walter de Gruyter, 1999.

1929 British novels
Novels by Edgar Wallace
British thriller novels
British novels adapted into films
Female characters in literature
Fictional professional thieves